Tan Xiang Tian (born 1992), is a Singaporean martial artist. In 2015, Tan became Singapore third world wushu champion after winning xingyiquan at the 2015 World Wushu Championships in Jakarta, Indonesia.

Early life 
Tan was educated at Victoria School and later studied psychology at James Cook University.

Other Awards 
Tan won the Singapore National Olympic Council Meritious Award in 2016.

References

1992 births
Living people
Singaporean martial artists
Singaporean male martial artists
Victoria School, Singapore alumni
Singaporean people of Chinese descent